is a fictional character and a major villain in the Dragon Ball Z manga and anime created by Akira Toriyama. He makes his debut in chapter #361 "The Mysterious Monster, Finally Appears!!", first published in Weekly Shōnen Jump on 16 February 1992. Cell is an evil artificial life form created using cell samples from several major characters in the series. He travels back in time so he can become the perfect being. In order to reach this goal, he must absorb Androids 17 and 18.

Creation and conception

After Kazuhiko Torishima, Toriyama's former editor during Dr. Slump and early Dragon Ball, expressed dissatisfaction with first Androids #19 and #20 and later Androids #17 and #18 as villains, Toriyama created Cell. Toriyama has expressed some kind of regret regarding the design of Cell, calling it tedious to draw all the little spots on his body. In addition, he did not initially plan for the character to be able to transform, but gave him this ability after his then-current editor Yū Kondō described Cell as "ugly." Toriyama intended for Cell's second form to last longer than it did; Kondō found the form to be silly and urged him to hasten the first appearance of the next transformation.

Norio Wakamoto is the Japanese voice of Cell and revealed that when he voiced the forms of Cell, the first form is monster-like, he used a raspy voice which he said was a pain. He toned it down for the second, and by the final form, he was able to perform comfortably.

In the English Funimation dub, Cell is voiced by Dameon Clarke. Clarke considers Cell one of his more "fun and entertaining" characters. Sometime around the release of Resurrection 'F', in which Frieza returned, Clarke said he began receiving questions about a film featuring Cell's return, which he himself supported.

Abilities
Thanks to being genetically created with the DNA of the Z-Fighters, along with Frieza being spliced together; Cell has super strength, speed, agility, reflexes, the ability to fly with the ability to generate energy from his very being called ki, generate energy blasts, absorb energy blasts, absorb energy and control energy along with telepathy, telekinesis, knows how to use the special attacks they use and during his fight with Goku
also learned how to use instant transmission or in other words teleport.

Appearances

Dragon Ball Z
Cell is an artificial life form (referred to as a "Bio-Android") created by Doctor Gero's supercomputer from the cell sample of the universe's strongest warriors, possessing the genetic information of Goku, Vegeta, Piccolo, Frieza, and King Cold in an underground complex beneath Gero's secret laboratory. Cell is designed to evolve into the "perfect" being by absorbing two Androids, #17 and #18. The Cell that appears as the primary antagonist of his titular arc is from the future, awakening after his development is complete to find that the Androids have been destroyed by Trunks. After he kills Trunks, Cell uses his time machine while regressing into an egg to travel back four years, to before the androids appeared, arriving in the present timeline. After hatching and metamorphosing from his larval, cicada-like form into his insect-like Imperfect form, Cell kills off thousands of people and absorbs them to increase his power in preparation to absorb the Androids. After he has managed to absorb the energy of entire cities of people, Cell finds Android #17 during his fight with Piccolo. Cell then breaks Piccolo's neck before Android #16 holds the mechanized villain off. However, he is able to find an opening to absorb #17 and evolve into Semi-Perfect Cell. Cell quickly dispatches #16, but he is unable to absorb #18 thanks to the intervention of Tenshinhan, who holds him back at the cost of his own life force before being rescued by Goku, along with a surviving Piccolo.

Cell tries to find Android #18, destroying islands to intimidate her into showing herself, but before he can destroy the island that #18 is hiding on, Vegeta appears and overwhelms him with newfound power. At the brink of defeat, Cell talks Vegeta into letting him absorb #18 so he can give him a better fight, and upon doing so, he assumes his final form, which is much more human like.

A week later, in the first round of the Cell Games, he quickly defeats Mr. Satan before moving onto Goku, who quits upon realizing Cell is stronger than him. Goku then nominates his son, Gohan, as Cell's next opponent, to everyone's surprise. Though Gohan puts up a good fight and proves himself his father's superior, Cell easily takes the upper hand due to his pacifistic nature. Wanting to avoid killing Cell if he can help it, Gohan warns Cell that if he is pushed too far, he will lose control of his anger and kill him, which only drives Cell to torment him further, excited to see this power. He spawns , miniature versions of himself who begin to fight the heroes, causing Gohan's rage to slowly swell. It is only when Cell mercilessly kills #16 after he had encouraged Gohan to fight that Gohan snaps, transforming into a Super Saiyan 2. Gohan effortlessly, violently kills all the Cell Juniors and then proceeds to effortlessly overpower Cell, aiming to prolong his suffering, dealing so much damage that Cell regurgitates Android #18 and reverts to his previous form. In desperation, Cell tries to self-destruct and destroy the Earth, but Goku sacrifices himself to ensure that Cell detonates elsewhere.

However, Cell is able to survive thanks to his unique physiology, which allows him to regenerate from a special nucleus in his head and grow more powerful whenever he has almost been killed, returning to his Perfect form even stronger than before. He easily kills Trunks, and when Vegeta attacks him in retaliation, he easily swats him aside. Before he can kill him, Gohan takes the blast in his place, which breaks his arm. With victory in his grasp, Cell decides to destroy the planet with one last Kamehameha, claiming he has the power to destroy the entire Solar System. Assisted by his father in spirit, Gohan retaliates with his own Kamehameha, ultimately overpowering Cell with Vegeta's help, destroying his cell nucleus and killing him once and for all. Mr. Satan, however, takes credit for the victory and becomes a hero.

Upon being resurrected by the Dragon Balls and returning to the future, Trunks destroys Androids #17 and #18, though realizes from his time travel that Cell is likely to emerge soon. Three years later, Trunks is confronted by the Cell of his timeline, who plans to kill Trunks and use his time machine in the same way his alternate self had. Future Cell realized Trunks travelled back already and learned of him in the past but thinks Trunks is no match for him. However, Trunks showcases his newfound power and easily kills him, finally bringing peace to the future.

In filler episodes of the anime, Cell makes numerous cameo appearances, usually as comic relief. Cell tries absorbing two siblings but is prevented from doing so by Krillin, giving chase to the three and nearly killing Krillin before he notices Piccolo and Tien Shinhan on the way and escapes. In his posthumous appearances, he is shown causing trouble in Hell along with Frieza, King Cold, and the Ginyu Force. He is defeated by Goku and Pikkon and sent to prison and is later seen watching Goku's battle with Majin Buu on a crystal ball, openly wondering why Goku quit against him and then went on to fight Buu, whom he acknowledges to be a stronger opponent than himself.

Dragon Ball Super
A few years later, when Trunks travels back to the past again, Trunks reacts in confusion to seeing Goku alive as he remembers his death from Cell's self-destructing. Goku is able to inform him of his resurrection that occurred after. Not long after, Bulma is revealed to have retained the Time Capsule that Cell had stolen from Trunks to return to the present timeline. Cell is remembered by Trunks when he notes the differences between Gohan as a child, in particular when he fought Cell, and him as an adult upon meeting him for the first time in years. An illusion of Cell appears in the Forest of Fear to Krillin and Goku, attacking the pair and growing in size before Krillin concentrates and dispels the illusion by confronting his fear. 

Although the original Cell does not appear in the film Dragon Ball Super: Super Hero, his schematics were used by the revived Red Ribbon Army to create a stronger model designated as "Cell Max", being a red-armored variant of Cell's Semi-Perfect form that lacks the original Cell's ability to regenerate. Serving as the film's final antagonist, he was activated by a desperate Magenta before his mind was fully developed, coming across as a mindless, rampaging monster.

In other media 
In Dragon Ball GT, after Goku is sent to Hell by accident, he confronts both Cell and Frieza, whose bodies have been rendered temporarily immortal due to the upset in the balance between the two worlds. Though Cell and Frieza trap Goku with their new joint attack and freeze him using a witch below them, they too are frozen after foolishly venturing down to gloat at him, and due to being dead, they cannot thaw out as Goku did. Goku accidentally breaks the ice Cell and Frieza are trapped within to pieces, implying that Cell and Frieza have been erased from existence. However, in a future scene, Frieza and Cell are seen being taken away in a jail cell with tape over their mouths. Cell and Frieza also appear in the GT live-action show, with new forms.

Cell appears in a TV ad for Dragon Ball Z: Battle of Gods, questioning why he is not in the film while Frieza brags that he is, Cell then remarks that Frieza only has a non-speaking appearance.

Video games 
Cell appears in a number of video games as a boss and playable character, most notably the Budokai, Budokai Tenkaichi and Raging Blast series. He is also a playable character in the Dragon Ball Z: Collectible Card Game. In several games, Cell has forms that have been created specifically for the instalment.

In the 1995 game Dragon Ball Z: Super Battle, after Goku defeats Cell, he gives him a Senzu Bean and allows him to live, Cell promising to return and win.

In Dragon Ball Z: Budokai, Cell has a nightmare where he accidentally absorbs Krillin and becomes , with the form leaving him weaker. In the 2003 game Dragon Ball Z: Budokai 2, Cell is revived by Bobbidi and becomes a Majin, his appearance being altered with the letter "M" on his forehead alongside black lining appearing under his eyes. This form is short-lived, as Majin Boo terminates Bobbidi, with Cell being absorbed afterwards by Boo.

In the 2005 video game Dragon Ball Z: Budokai Tenkaichi, Cell defeats Gohan and confronts Super 17, defeating him when the two conflict over a shared interest in killing Goku.

In the 2015 game Dragon Ball: Xenoverse, Cell appears as a mentor for the player, teaching the Perfect Kamehameha, Perfect Shot, All Clear and Gravity Impact to the player. Within the context of the game's story mode, Cell defeats Gohan until the player intervenes in their fight, and the version of the character from Trunks' timeline is able to reach his Perfect form thanks to Towa's strengthening, though he is destroyed by the player and Trunks.

In the 2016 game Dragon Ball Xenoverse 2, Cell shows up in his Perfect Form and fights Trunks, also meeting Android 16 for the first time and fighting alongside him. Cell is able to reach his Perfect form after defeating both Piccolo and #16 and absorbing #17 and #18 at the same time. When an empowered Android #17 fights Piccolo, Trunks warns the player Cell that succeeding in absorbing him would mean an even larger power boost than in the main timeline. Cell himself shows up empowered, easily dominating Android #16. Cell later fights alongside the corrupted Cell Juniors, and welcomes Metal Cooler to the Cell Games.

In the 2018 game Dragon Ball FighterZ, Cell defeats Android 18 and is confronted by Goku and Krillin while aiming a beam at her and Android 21. After being defeated, Cell uses the Solar Flare to escape. Cell laments his lack of power before being confronted by Frieza, who offers him a deal where the two divulge information to each other. The player becomes connected to Cell after Goku is shot by Android 21, and fights Android 21 while controlling Cell's body. Cell escapes from Android 21 with another Solar Flare, and the player returns to Goku from the strain on Cell's body

Cell is also a playable character in the crossover fighting games Battle Stadium D.O.N. and Jump Force, as well as a support character in Jump Ultimate Stars.

Reception
In 2004, fans of the series voted Cell the fourteenth most popular character for a poll in the book Dragon Ball Forever. In 2015, Jacob Yothment ranked Cell No. 3 on his list Top 10 Villains of the Dragon Ball Franchise, Shawn Saris of IGN ranked Cell No. 7 on the list Top 13 Dragon Ball Z Characters, and Otakukart.com ranked Cell No. 2 on the list Top 10 Dragon Ball Villains. In 2016, Cell was ranked No. 6 on the saikoplus.com list 10 Most Popular Characters in Dragon Ball Z.

Michael Zupan assessed Cell as the Dragon Ball villain with the most buildup, writing, "The Z Fighters throw everything they have at this character, and just when you think he's beat... he transforms into something more powerful." Dennis Amith of J!-ENT described Cell as "the toughest enemy that the team has fought yet" and liked how the efforts of the other characters trying to stop Cell is the main focus of that part of the series. J. Steiff and T. D. Tamplin used Cell as an example of the concept of "leveling up" in anime and believed Cell follows this concept well.

The concept of the Cell Games and its execution were criticized. D. F. Smith of IGN criticized Cell's decision to hold a fighting tournament instead of destroying Earth as a sign of the author has run out of ideas. Reviewer Josh Begley had disapproval toward the tournament as he believed it would feature "endless fighting and no real plot progression." Luke Ryan Baldock took issue with the tournament based season for its lack of plot and high amount of action.

References

Further reading
 

Anime and manga characters who can move at superhuman speeds
Anime and manga characters who can teleport
Anime and manga characters with accelerated healing
Anime and manga characters with superhuman strength
Anime and manga supervillains
Martial artist characters in anime and manga
Fictional mixed martial artists
Fictional male martial artists
Comics characters introduced in 1992
Dragon Ball characters
Fictional androids
Fictional attempted suicides
Fictional blade and dart throwers
Fictional characters who can change size
Fictional characters who can duplicate themselves
Fictional characters who can manipulate light
Fictional characters with absorption or parasitic abilities
Fictional characters with energy-manipulation abilities
Fictional characters with extrasensory perception
Fictional characters with slowed ageing
Fictional characters with superhuman durability or invulnerability
Fictional kidnappers
Fictional genetically engineered characters
Fictional hybrids
Fictional insects
Fictional mass murderers
Fictional rampage and spree killers
Shapeshifter characters in comics
Fictional telekinetics
Fighting game characters
Male characters in anime and manga
Male supervillains
Time travelers
Video game bosses